Grove Bush is a village in the Southland region of New Zealand's South Island.  It is located on the banks of the Makarewa River on the Southland Plains near the foothills of the Hokonui Hills.

The village's main feature is its community hall.  It is situated in a rural area of fertile farmland; the nearest city, Invercargill, is approximately 20 km southwest.  Other small townships are nearby: Mabel Bush is just to the east, while Springhills and Hedgehope are to the north and Rakahouka is to the south.

Demographics

Grove Bush had a population of 1,158 at the 2018 New Zealand census, an increase of 93 people (8.7%) since the 2013 census, and an increase of 183 people (18.8%) since the 2006 census. There were 402 households. There were 582 males and 576 females, giving a sex ratio of 1.01 males per female. The median age was 38.9 years (compared with 37.4 years nationally), with 267 people (23.1%) aged under 15 years, 183 (15.8%) aged 15 to 29, 567 (49.0%) aged 30 to 64, and 135 (11.7%) aged 65 or older.

Ethnicities were 90.9% European/Pākehā, 6.0% Māori, 0.5% Pacific peoples, 4.7% Asian, and 2.1% other ethnicities (totals add to more than 100% since people could identify with multiple ethnicities).

The proportion of people born overseas was 9.3%, compared with 27.1% nationally.

Although some people objected to giving their religion, 50.3% had no religion, 39.4% were Christian, 0.3% were Hindu, 0.3% were Buddhist and 1.3% had other religions.

Of those at least 15 years old, 144 (16.2%) people had a bachelor or higher degree, and 198 (22.2%) people had no formal qualifications. The median income was $41,500, compared with $31,800 nationally. 198 people (22.2%) earned over $70,000 compared to 17.2% nationally. The employment status of those at least 15 was that 534 (59.9%) people were employed full-time, 156 (17.5%) were part-time, and 15 (1.7%) were unemployed.

References 

Populated places in Southland, New Zealand